Ash is an unincorporated community in Brunswick County, North Carolina, United States. Ash has a post office with ZIP code 28420, which opened on November 17, 1884.

References

Unincorporated communities in Brunswick County, North Carolina
Unincorporated communities in North Carolina